The 1983 NatWest Trophy was an English limited overs county cricket tournament which was held between 29 June and 3 September 1983. The 
third NatWest Trophy competition, it was won by Somerset who defeated Kent by 24 runs in the final at Lord's.

Format
The seventeen first-class counties were joined by thirteen Minor Counties.  This was a change from the previous versions of the competition, where only five Minor Counties were permitted to take part. The Minor Counties taking part were: Berkshire, Cambridgeshire, Cheshire, Devon, Dorset, Durham, Hertfordshire, Lincolnshire, Norfolk, Oxfordshire, Shropshire, Suffolk and Wiltshire.  The Ireland team also participated, along with Scotland national cricket team for the first time.  Teams who won in the first round progressed to the second round. The winners in the second round then progressed to the quarter-final stage.  Winners from the quarter-finals then progressed to the semi-finals from which the winners then went on to the final at Lord's which was held on 3 September 1983.

First round

Second round

Quarter-finals

Semi-finals

Final

References

External links
CricketArchive tournament page 

Friends Provident Trophy seasons
Natwest Trophy, 1983
NatWest Group